Ecliptoides azadi is a species of beetle in the family Cerambycidae. It was described by Gérard Tavakilian and Ana Peñaherrera-Leiva in 2003.

References

Rhinotragini
Beetles described in 2003